L. intermedia  may refer to:
 Loxosceles intermedia, a recluse spider, commonly known as the "Brazilian brown spider"
 Lagerstroemia intermedia, a plant species found in China and Thailand
 Lebeda intermedia, a moth species found in Borneo, Sumatra and Peninsular Malaysia

Synonyms
 Liocranchia intermedia, a synonym for Liocranchia reinhardti, a deep sea squid species found worldwide in tropical and subtropical waters

See also
 Intermedia (disambiguation)